The 2006 Ukrainian Super Cup became the third edition of Ukrainian Super Cup, an annual football match contested by the winners of the previous season's Ukrainian Top League and Ukrainian Cup competitions.

The match was played at the Central Stadium "Chornomorets", Odessa, on 16 July 2006, and contested by league winner Shakhtar Donetsk and cup winner Dynamo Kyiv. Dynamo won it 2–0.

Match

Details

Statistics

References

2006
2006–07 in Ukrainian football
FC Dynamo Kyiv matches
FC Shakhtar Donetsk matches
Sport in Odesa